A Cash receipts journal is a specialized accounting journal and it is referred to as the main entry book used in an accounting system to keep track of the sales of items when cash is received, by crediting sales and debiting cash and transactions related to receipts. Sales on account are booked instead in the sales journal.

Cash receipts journal is considered as the separate part of Cash account/cash book as it records the cash inflow of the business. The source document of this prime entry book is Receipt.

A general structure of the Cash receipts journal

References

Accounting journals and ledgers